The 2018 Watford Borough Council election took place on 3 May 2018 to elect members of Watford Borough Council in England. This was the same day as other local elections.

Watford was one of the boroughs subject to a trial of voter ID restrictions requiring the production of polling cards.

Since the election of the full council in 2016, there had been three by-elections, but the balance of the council remained the same, as they were won by the defending party, in the case of Leggatts Ward by Labour and in the cases of Oxhey and Park by the Lib Dems.

Mayoral Election Candidates
Peter Taylor of the Liberal Democrats retained the Watford majority for the Liberal Democrats on the second count. Prior to the election, the mayor had been Dorothy Thornhill, representing the Liberal Democrats.

Results Summary

Ward Results

An asterisk * indicates an incumbent seeking re-election.

Callowland

No UKIP candidate as previous (-9.6%)

Central

Holywell

Leggatts

Meriden

Nascot

Oxhey

Park

Stanborough

Tudor

a Darren Harrison was suspended by the Conservative Party after having alleged links to the EDL and other far-right groups. He remained on the ballot as a Conservative candidate.

Vicarage

Woodside

References

2018 English local elections
2018
2010s in Hertfordshire